Pásztó is a town in Nógrád County, Hungary.

Tibor Rubin was born in Pásztó on 18 June 1929. It then had a Jewish population of 120 families.

Twin towns – sister cities

Pásztó is twinned with:
 Ruffec, France

Notable people
Antal Vágó (1891–1944), footballer
Dávid Bobál (1995–), footballer
Tibor Rubin (1929–2015), American Army Officer
Vendel Endrédy (1895–1981), monk and the abbot of Zirc, Pilis-Paszto and St. Gotthard abbeys
Csaba Hegedűs (1985–), footballer
Zsolt Becsó (1967–), politician
István Kozma (1964–), footballer

See also
History of the Jews in Hungary

References

External links

 in Hungarian
Street map 

Populated places in Nógrád County